Dimitrios Oungialidis (born 24 October 1994) is a Greek professional footballer who plays as a left-back for Super League 2 club Makedonikos.

Honours
Volos
 Football League: 2018–19

References

1994 births
Living people
Greek footballers
Super League Greece players
Football League (Greece) players
Super League Greece 2 players
AEL Kalloni F.C. players
Agrotikos Asteras F.C. players
Veria F.C. players
Volos N.F.C. players
Association football defenders
Footballers from Kozani